The Municipality of the County of Richmond  is a county municipality on Cape Breton Island, Nova Scotia, Canada. It provides local government to the eponymous historical county, except for the Chapel Island 5 reserve. The municipality also contains the village of St. Peter's. Municipal office are at Arichat. It is the site of St. Peters Canal.

It was named for a Governor General of British North America, Charles Lennox, 4th Duke of Richmond, and created in 1835, having formerly been part of Cape Breton County.

Demographics 

See also 
 List of municipalities in Nova Scotia

References

External links 

 
Richmond